Sodashi ( foaled 8 March 2018) is a pure white Japanese Thoroughbred racehorse who won the 2021 Japanese 1000 Guineas. She was also one of the best two-year-olds in Japan in 2020 when she was unbeaten in four races including the Sapporo Nisai Stakes, Artemis Stakes and Hanshin Juvenile Fillies. In 2021 she won the Oka Sho but sustained her first defeat when running unplaced in the Yushun Himba. The filly returned to the track in August and defeated older rivals in the Sapporo Kinen.

Background
Sodashi is a pure white filly bred in Japan by Northern Farm, the breeding operation of her owner Makoto Kaneko. She was sent into training with Naosuke Sugai.

She was from the seventeenth crop of foals sired by Kurofune, an American-bred stallion who won the NHK Mile Cup and the Japan Cup Dirt in 2001. As a breeding stallion, his other progeny have included Curren Chan, Clarity Sky (NHK Mile Cup), Sleepless Night (Sprinters Stakes), Fusaichi Richard (Asahi Hai Futurity Stakes) and Whale Capture (Victoria Mile).

Sodashi's maternal grand-dam Shirayukihime (meaning "Snow White") was a rare white Thoroughbred foaled in 1996 to non-white parents. Her other descendants (many of whom have also been white) have included Hayayakko (Leopard Stakes) and Meikei Yell (Kokura Nisai Stakes, Fantasy Stakes). Sodashi's dam Buchiko, who won four races, was a white mare with an unusual pattern of dark patches and spots on her coat. Shirayukihime herself was a female-line descendant of the Italian broodmare Milonga (foaled in 1948) making her a distant relative of Hansel.

Racing career

2020: two-year-old season
Sodashi was ridden in all of her starts as a two-year-old by Hayato Yoshida. The filly made her debut in an event for previously unraced juveniles over 1800 metres on firm ground at Hakodate Racecourse on 12 July and won by two and a half lengths from the colt Gallant Warrior.

On September 5, Sodashi was stepped up in class for the Grade 3 Sapporo Nisai Stakes over the same distance at Sapporo Racecourse and started the 3.7/1 second favourite in a fourteen-runner field. After tracking the leaders she gained the advantage in the straight and won by a neck from Uberleben with a gap of a length and three quarters back to the favourite Bathrat Leon.

On her next appearance Sodashi started the 2.5/1 favourite for the Grade 3 Artemis Stakes over 1600 metres at Tokyo Racecourse on 31 October. She raced in second place behind the front-running outsider Orange Fizz before taking the lead in the straight, breaking clear of the field and winning by one and three quarter lengths and half a length from Kukuna and Ten Happy Rose.

On 10 December Sodashi was moved up to the highest class to contest the Grade 1 Hanshin Juvenile Fillies over 1600 metres at Hanshin Racecourse and went off the 2.2/1 favourite against seventeen opponents including Satono Reinas (Saffron Sho), Meikei Yell (Kokura Nisai Stakes, Fantasy Stakes), Infinite (second in the Saudi Arabia Royal Cup), and Uberleben. In the build up to the race, Hayato Yoshida said "[White horses] are all very sensitive and high maintenance. You do need to be careful with them but with her, that sensitive side is bringing out the best in her. She breaks well and is super responsive when you tell her to go. She’s really smart and a very complete racehorse." The filly settled in fourth place on the inside as the outsider Yoka Yoka set the early pace. After looking to be unlikely to obtain a clear run in the straight, she went to the front inside the last 200 metres and held off the late challenges of Satono Reinas and Uberleben to win by a nose and a neck, becoming the first white Japanese horse to win a graded turf race. Yoshida commented "Going into the race as favorite was a bit of a load, but I'm thrilled with the outcome. She hated to even go near the gate but I'm relieved that all went well and that we were able to be positioned just as I hoped. The going affected her good turn of foot but she gave all she had. There is room for improvement, and I hope we can get her ready for next year's classics."

In January 2021, Sodashi was unanimously voted Japan's Best Two-Year-Old Filly at the JRA Awards for 2020. In the official Japanese rankings Sodashi was rated the best two-year-old filly of 2020, one pound ahead of Satono Reinas.

2021: three-year-old season
Sodashi made her first start of 2021 in the first leg of the Japanese Fillies Triple Crown, the Japanese 1000 Guineas, where she won by a neck over Satono Reinas. She developed from being "that white filly" to genuine stardom. She suffered her first defeat when she finished eight out of eighteen runners in the 2021 Japanese Oaks, the second leg of the fillies' Triple Crown. She would then go on to win the Sapporo Kinen over open company before closing out her season with a tenth-place finish in the Shūka Sho and a twelfth-place finish in the Champions Cup.

2022: four-year-old season
After a third-place finish in the February Stakes over the dirt, Sodashi was entered in the Grade 1 Victoria Mile on the turf against fillies and mares. After settling in fourth position for most of the trip, Sodashi stormed to the lead and to victory in the uphill stretch at Tokyo Racecourse under regular jockey Hayato Yoshida.

Pedigree

References

2018 racehorse births
Racehorses bred in Japan
Racehorses trained in Japan
Thoroughbred family 2-w